Chai (also spelled as Tsai, Tchai) is a Chinese surname. The same surname is Sài in Vietnamese, and Si (sometimes spelled as Shi, See, Sie, Sea) in Korean.

Chai is listed 325th in the Song dynasty classic text Hundred Family Surnames. As of 2008, it is the 127th most common surname in China, shared by 1.35 million people.

Notable people
Chai Shao (588–638), Chinese military general in the Tang Dynasty
Chai Rong (921–959), Chinese emperor of the Later Zhou Dynasty
Chai Zongxun (953–973), Chinese emperor of the Later Zhou Dynasty, Chai Rong's son
Chai Zemin (1916–2010), Chinese diplomat
Chai Songyue (born 1941), Chinese politician
Makana Risser Chai (born 1953), American author and massage therapist
Mark Chai (born 1954), Hawaiian-Chinese sculptor
Chai Hui-chen (born  1955), Taiwanese general and politician
Arlene J. Chai (born 1955), Filipino author
Nelson Chai (born 1965), American businessman
Chai Ling (born 1966), Chinese student leader in the 1989 Tian'anmen Square protests
Chai Jing (born 1976), Chinese journalist and host
Chai Biao (born 1990), Chinese badminton player

In fiction:
Chai Jin, fictional character in the novel Water Margin, descendant of Chai Rong
Chai Xianghua, fictional character in the Soulcalibur video game series

See also

Cai (surname)
Chal (name)
Char (name)
Qi (surname 齊)

References

Surnames
Chinese-language surnames
Individual Chinese surnames